Statistics of Nemzeti Bajnokság I for the 1919–20 season.

Overview
It was contested by 15 teams, and MTK Hungária FC won the championship.

League standings

Results

References
Hungary - List of final tables (RSSSF)

1919-20
Hun
1